Labeobarbus ethiopicus is a species of ray-finned fish. Usually placed in the genus Labeobarbus. It is endemic to Lake Ziway in Ethiopia.

References

 

ethiopicus
Fish of Ethiopia
Endemic fauna of Ethiopia
Fish described in 1939
Lake fish of Africa